Global Relations Forum (GRF) is an independent, non-profit membership association founded on May 11, 2009 in Turkey with the committed support of 40 Turkish men and women who have assumed prominent roles in international fora and have received international recognition for their efforts throughout their careers. The founding members include former secretaries of state, university presidents, central bank governors, ECHR justice and retired ambassadors as well as leading business leaders, scholars, artists, and journalists. GRF is supposed to be a platform for engaging, informing and stimulating its members and all interested individuals in all matters related to international affairs and global issues.

GRF advocates a global order of shared influence and accountability and seeks a constructive role for Turkey in that order.

GRF Board Members
Rahmi Koç , Memduh Karakullukçu, Hanzade Doğan Boyner, Lucien Arkas, Aslı Başgöz, Hasan T. Çolakoğlu, Salim Dervişoğlu, Suzan Sabancı Dinçer , Ali Doğramacı , Metin Fadıllıoğlu, Sönmez Köksal , Gülsün Sağlamer, Özdem Sanberk, Ferit Şahenk , İlter Türkmen

GRF Studies

GRF Task Forces
GRF Task Forces are independent commissions that strive to propose policy recommendations on matters that involve medium to long-term uncertainty.
Task Force members are diverse in professional backgrounds, experience and opinion but unite around the principles of consultation and search for common ground. Task Force members participate in the Task Force in their individual capacities; their views do not necessarily represent those of their institutions.

Track-II Studies

GRF Community
GRF Community is composed of individuals who participated in one of GRF Programs.
YS and YSA programs have been created by GRF to provide its participants with a platform where they can analyse and debate global issues. Students are selected from current undergraduates studying at world’s leading universities and leading universities in Istanbul. 

YAc brings together young academics that are either in the last year of their doctorate studies or have completed their Ph.D. in Turkey or abroad within the last three years.
Participants of YPr are expected to have worked in a private company, a public institution, or an NGO for at least four years, and to be no older than 38.

Membership
GRF members are Turkish men and women who have assumed prominent roles in international fora and have received international recognition for their efforts throughout their careers.
Corporate membership is designed for globally engaged companies, that can contribute significantly to GRF’s work.

References 

2009 establishments in Turkey
Global policy organizations
Non-profit organizations based in Turkey
Organizations established in 2009